Disabled homolog 2-interacting protein is a protein that in humans is encoded by the DAB2IP gene.

DAB2IP is a Ras (MIM 190020) GTPase-activating protein (GAP) that acts as a tumor suppressor gene and is inactivated by methylation in prostate and breast cancers (Yano et al., 2005).[supplied by OMIM]

Interactions
DAB2IP has been shown to interact with DAB2.

References

Further reading